Fabienne Pascaud (born July 1, 1955) is a journalist, critic, and editor in chief for French publication Télérama. She is best known for her theater criticism.

References

1955 births
Living people
20th-century French writers
21st-century French writers
French critics
French women critics
French women writers
Journalists from Paris
Chevaliers of the Légion d'honneur
20th-century French women writers
21st-century French women writers